Ross Township is one of thirteen townships in Butler County, Ohio, United States. It is located in the south-central part of  the county, southwest of the city of Hamilton. The population was 8,736 at the 2020 census.

History
One of the five original townships of the county, it was erected by the Butler County Court of Quarter Sessions on May 10, 1803.

Geography
Located in the southern part of the county, it borders the following townships:
Hanover Township - north
St. Clair Township - northeast
Fairfield Township - east
Colerain Township, Hamilton County - southeast
Crosby Township, Hamilton County - southwest
Morgan Township - west
Reily Township - northwest corner

Name
It is named for James Ross (1762–1847), a Federalist United States senator from Pennsylvania when the township was erected. Statewide, other Ross Townships are located in Greene and Jefferson counties.

Government
The township is governed by a three-member board of trustees, who are elected in November of odd-numbered years to a four-year term beginning on the following January 1.  Two are elected in the year after the presidential election and one is elected in the year before it.  There is also an elected township fiscal officer, who serves a four-year term beginning on April 1 of the year after the election, which is held in November of the year before the presidential election.  Vacancies in the fiscal officership or on the board of trustees are filled by the remaining trustees.

References

Bert S. Barlow, W.H. Todhunter, Stephen D. Cone, Joseph J. Pater, and Frederick Schneider, eds.  Centennial History of Butler County, Ohio.  Hamilton, Ohio:  B.F. Bowen, 1905.
Jim Blount.  The 1900s:  100 Years In the History of Butler County, Ohio.  Hamilton, Ohio:  Past Present Press, 2000.
Butler County Engineer's Office.  Butler County Official Transportation Map, 2003.  Fairfield Township, Butler County, Ohio:  The Office, 2003.
A History and Biographical Cyclopaedia of Butler County, Ohio with Illustrations and Sketches of Its Representative Men and Pioneers.  Cincinnati, Ohio:  Western Biographical Publishing Company, 1882. 
Ohio. Secretary of State.  The Ohio municipal and township roster, 2002-2003.  Columbus, Ohio:  The Secretary, 2003.

External links
Ross Township official website
County website

Townships in Butler County, Ohio
Townships in Ohio
1803 establishments in Ohio
Populated places established in 1803